IWCC may stand for:

 Intermountain West Communications Company
 International Women's Club Championship
 International Women's Cricket Council
 Iowa Western Community College